Trachelipus pierantonii is a species of woodlouse in the genus Trachelipus belonging to the family Trachelipodidae that can be found in Trento, Italy.

References

External links

Trachelipodidae
Endemic fauna of Italy
Woodlice of Europe
Crustaceans described in 1932